Florence Nightingale was a 60-minute 2008 BBC One television drama on the early years of Florence Nightingale, from 1837 to the Royal Commission into the Crimean War.  Nightingale was played by Laura Fraser, and her father by Michael Pennington.  It was first broadcast on Sunday 1 June 2008.

Cast
Laura Fraser as Florence Nightingale
Michael Pennington as Wen, Florence's father
Derek Hicks as Surviving Soldier
Zoe Street Howe as Queen Victoria
Andrew Harrison as Lord Palmerston
Lorraine Cheshire as Watson, Nightingale maid
Roy Hudd as Music Hall Barker
Daryl Fishwick as Music Hall Florence
Ben Stott as Music Hall Singer
Sam Maurice, Paul Moorcroft, Richard Kelly, Harriet Web, and Kate Joseph as Music Hall Performers
Robert Aram as Doctor
Barbara Marten as Fanny, Florence's mother
Catherine Tyldesley as Parthenope, Florence's elder sister
Ian Bartholomew as Sidney Herbert
Keith Clifford as the colonel
Paul Opacic as Richard Monckton Milnes
Chris Kerry, Cheryl Willday, Violet Foode, Wendy Patterson, and Debbie Rush as Nurse interviewees
Olwen May as Mother Mary Clare
John Axon as Orderly
Jon Croft as Sir John Hall
Tim Beasley as Fitzgerald
Sam McKenzie as Dr Farr

Crew
Writer and director - Norman Stone
Producer - Roger Childs
Consulting Producer - Kenneth Cavander
Director of Photography - Michael Fox
Editor - Colin Goudie
Music - Jeremy Soule

Filming locations
Lea hurst, Derbyshire
Butterley Station, Ripley
St John the Baptist Church, Tideswell
Manchester Town Hall
Croxteth Hall, St George's Hall, High Park Reservoir - Liverpool

External links
 

2008 films
2008 television films
2000s biographical films
British biographical films
British television films
Crimean War films
Films scored by Jeremy Soule
Films about Florence Nightingale
Films set in the 19th century
Films shot in Derbyshire
Films shot in Greater Manchester
Films shot in Merseyside
Cultural depictions of Queen Victoria
Cultural depictions of Florence Nightingale
2000s British films